The Palais du Pharo is a palace in Marseille, France. It was built in 1858 by Emperor Napoleon III for Empress Eugénie.

External links

Buildings and structures in Marseille
Palaces in France
Napoleon III
Imperial residences in France